Simon Dalby is an Irish born academic and CIGI Chair in the Political Economy of Climate Change at the Balsillie School of International Affairs.  Dalby works in the disciplines of environmental security and critical geopolitics.

Bibliography 
Books
 Security and Environmental Change (Polity, 2009).
 Environmental Security, University of Minnesota Press, 2002)  
 Rethinking Geopolitics, co-edited with Gearoid O Tuathail (Routledge, 1998)
 The Geopolitics Reader, co-edited with Gearoid O Tuathail and Paul Routledge (Routledge, 1998, 2nd ed., 2006)

Journal articles

References

External links
 Autobiography

1958 births
Irish geographers
Political geographers
Security studies
Living people
Academic staff of Carleton University
Place of birth missing (living people)